The Women's African Olympic Qualifier is the qualification tournament for the women's field hockey event at the Summer Olympics. It is held every four years and was introduced after field hockey was removed from the All-Africa Games program. The first edition was held in Nairobi, Kenya simultaneously with the 2007 All-Africa Games.

Results

Summaries

Top four statistics

* = host nation

Team appearances

See also
 Men's African Olympic Qualifier
 Women's Hockey Africa Cup of Nations
 Field hockey at the African Games

References

Olympic qualifier
 Women